Conchita is an opera in four acts and six scenes by composer Riccardo Zandonai. The work premièred in Milan at the Teatro dal Verme on 14 October 1911 with soprano Tarquinia Tarquini, who later married Zandonai in 1917, in the title role. Her portrayal was lauded by critics and she went on to perform Conchita at the Royal Opera, London (1912), the Cort Theatre in San Francisco (1912), the Philharmonic Auditorium in Hollywood (1912), the Heilig Theatre in Portland (1912), the Metropolitan Opera House in Philadelphia (1912), the Chicago Grand Opera Company (1913), and the Teatro di San Carlo in Naples (1913). The opera was published by G. Ricordi & Co in 1912.

Roles

Synopsis
The story takes place in Seville.

Conchita Pérez, a poor cigar maker, is wooed by Matteo, but she resists his advances. Matteo pays her mother some money to relieve their poverty. Offended, Conchita escapes and becomes a somewhat famous flamenco dancer. Matteo tracks her down and continues his advances as she resists them. To prove his love, she organizes a meeting with a fake lover in front of Matteo who becomes very irate as a result. She finally has proof of his love for her, which she now can reciprocate.

References

Operas by Riccardo Zandonai
Italian-language operas
Operas set in Spain
1911 operas
Operas
Operas based on novels
Adaptations of works by Pierre Louÿs